Hilda Walterová, also Hilde Doleschell, (21 February 1915 – 19 April 2013) was a Czech alpine skier. She competed in the women's combined event at the 1936 Winter Olympics.

References

1915 births
2013 deaths
Czech female alpine skiers
Olympic alpine skiers of Czechoslovakia
Alpine skiers at the 1936 Winter Olympics
Sportspeople from Liberec
Austrian female tennis players